Chuandianella ovata is an extinct bivalved arthropod that lived during  Cambrian Stage 3 of the Early Cambrian (about 520 to 516 million years ago). It is the only species classified under the genus Chuandianella. Its fossils were recovered from the Chengjiang Biota in Yunnan, China.

Taxonomy 
It was originally described in 1975 under the "ostracod"-like genus Mononotella, as Mononotella ovata. In 1991, the paleontologists Xian-Guang Hou and Jan Bergström reclassified it under the new genus Chuandianella when additional discoveries of more complete specimens made its resemblance to Waptia fieldensis more apparent. In 2004, paleontologist Jun-Yuan Chen tentatively transferred it to the genus Waptia. However, C. ovata had eight abdominal somites in contrast to five in W. fieldensis. Its limbs were biramous and were undifferentiated, unlike those of W. fieldensis. Other authors deemed these differences to be enough to separate it from Waptia to its own genus. In 2022, a detailed restudy was published, which rejected Chuandianella from Hymenocarina, the group includes Waptia, because of absence of mandibles and maxillae, and was instead considered an "upper stem-group arthropod" as opposed to the more derived mandibulate hymenocarines.

Description 

The carapace was composed of calcium phosphate. The head had a pair of stalked eyes. The body has at least 18 segments. The first appendage pair is elongate and antenniform with 10 podomeres with each podomere bearing inward-facing setae, and the second appendage is uniramous and short and has 6 podomeres. These are followed by 10 biramous appendage pairs that are all similar to each other, which have endopods each with at least 27 podomeres, which have blade-like endites projecting perpendicularly from the limb axis, which have been described as "feather like". The exopods are short and paddle-shaped. The trunk terminates with a pair of elongate caudal flukes.

Ecology 
It has been suggested that it was an active swimmer and a filter feeder, using its feathery endopod endites to capture small food particles from the water column, with the short second appendage used to help process food.

See also
Waptia
List of Chengjiang Biota species by phylum
Burgess Shale
Burgess shale type preservation

References

Prehistoric arthropod genera
Maotianshan shales fossils